Paulo Francisco da Silva Paz or simply Chiquinho (born June 20, 1983 in Canguçu), is a Brazilian left back. He currently plays for Paulista Futebol Clube.

Honours
Rio Grande do Sul State Superleague: 2002
Rio Grande do Sul State League: 2003, 2004, 3008
Brazilian Cup: 2006

External links
 CBF
 sambafoot
 zerozero.pt
 Goiás contrata Paulo Francisco
 globoesporte
 goiasesporteclube

1983 births
Sportspeople from Rio Grande do Sul
Living people
Brazilian footballers
Sport Club Internacional players
Sociedade Esportiva Palmeiras players
Goiás Esporte Clube players
Grêmio Esportivo Brasil players
Esporte Clube Vitória players
Paulista Futebol Clube players
Association football defenders